The Deadwood Metropolitans were a minor league baseball team based in Deadwood, South Dakota. In 1891 and 1892, the Metropolitans played as members of the Independent level Black Hills League, hosting home games at Olympic Park.

History
Baseball was a popular sport in the mining towns of the era, Deadwood included. Deadwood fielded a team when the first "Black Hills Base Ball League" was formed on August 11, 1885. The league was formed to organize existing town teams and combat violence and gambling. The charter teams of the Black Hills Base Ball League were the Metropolitans (Deadwood, South Dakota), Eighty-Stamps (Rapid City, South Dakota), Athletes of Fort Meade (Fort Meade, South Dakota), Belt Club (Central City, South Dakota), Terraville (Terraville, South Dakota), Red Stockings Spearfish, South Dakota and the Sturgis Nine Sturgis, South Dakota.

In 1891, Deadwood continued to field a team when the Black Hills League began minor league play as a four–team Independent league, with franchises based in both Nebraska and South Dakota. The other 1891 Black Hills League charter franchises were the teams from Chadron, Nebraska, Hot Springs and Lead, South Dakota (Lead City Grays). The 1891 league standings are unknown.

Deadwood continued play in the 1892 season, as same four league teams returned to play the final season of the minor league Black Hills League. The 1892 Black Hills League remained an Independent League and the circuit permanently folded following the 1892 season. Deadwood and the other host cities have not hosted minor league baseball since the Black Hills League folded. Kid Mohler and Bill Traffley played for the 1892 Deadwood Metropolitans.

The overall team records, standings and statistics from the 1891 and 1892 Black Hills League seasons are unknown.

After the demise of the Black Hills League minor league, a semi–pro league played under the same name for many seasons, through at least the 1950s. Deadwood fielded teams in the circuit.

The ballpark
The Deadwood Metropolitans played home games at Olympic Park.

Timeline

Year-by-year standings
The team records and standings from the 1891 and 1892 Black Hill League seasons are unknown.

Notable alumni
Kid Mohler, (1892)
Bill Traffley (1892)

See also
Deadwood Metropolitans players

References

External links
 Baseball Reference
Deadwood baseball history

Defunct baseball teams in South Dakota
Professional baseball teams in South Dakota
Baseball teams established in 1891
Baseball teams disestablished in 1892
Black Hills League teams
Deadwood, South Dakota
Lawrence County, South Dakota